Wadsworth Falls State Park, or simply Wadsworth Falls, is a public recreation and preserved natural area located on the Coginchaug River in the towns of Middletown and Middlefield, Connecticut. The state park's  offer trail hiking and fishing. Swimming and picnicking are allowed at the pond near the north entrance near 721 Wadsworth Street (CT Route 157) in Middletown. It is managed by the Connecticut Department of Energy and Environmental Protection.

History
The park bears the name of Colonel Clarence S. Wadsworth (1871–1941), an academic, linguist, conservationist, and member of the New York National Guard. Wadsworth developed the property that the park occupies in the early years of the 20th century as part of his Long Hill estate. He established the Rockfall Corporation as a charitable foundation to administer his properties and further his conservationist interests. Following his death, the corporation gave  of Wadsworth's estate to the people of Connecticut for preservation as Wadsworth Falls State Park.

In 1996, the portion of the park that lies within the town of Middletown, some 130 acres, was added to the National Register of Historic Places as part of the Wadsworth Estate Historic District. The district's central feature, the Wadsworth Mansion at Long Hill, lies adjacent to the park and may be reached from the park by way of the purple-blazed hiking trail.

Waterfalls
Two natural waterfalls lie within easy reach by park trails: the Big Falls, on the Coginchaug River, and the Little Falls, on Wadsworth Brook.

Activities and amenities
In addition to scenery and heavily forest lands, the park features stream fishing, and trails for hiking and mountain biking.

References

External links

Wadsworth Falls State Park Connecticut Department of Energy and Environmental Protection
Wadsworth Falls State Park Map Connecticut Department of Energy and Environmental Protection

State parks of Connecticut
Parks in Middlesex County, Connecticut
Protected areas established in 1942
Historic districts on the National Register of Historic Places in Connecticut
Middlefield, Connecticut
Middletown, Connecticut
Waterfalls of Connecticut
Landforms of Middlesex County, Connecticut
1942 establishments in Connecticut